Mohd Syafiq Shamim bin Abdul Razak (born 24 June 1992), known professionally as Syafiq Kyle, is a Malaysian actor. He is a former contestant of Hero Remaja 2011/12 with Fattah Amin, Hafidz Roshdi, Saharul Ridzwan, where he earned second place in the competition. Since then he began active as an actor on film and television. Recently he dated a Kajang born girl named Aqilah.

Filmography

Film

Television series

Telemovie

Awards and nominations

References

External links
 
 

1992 births
Living people
Malaysian people of Malay descent
People from Kuala Lumpur
21st-century Malaysian male actors
Malaysian male actors
Malaysian male film actors
Malaysian male television actors
Malaysian television presenters
Malaysian male models